Richard Morse may refer to:

 Richard Auguste Morse (born 1957), Haitian-American musician and manager
 Richard McGee Morse (1922–2001), scholar and professor at Columbia University
 Richard S. Morse (1911–1988), scientist and inventor of Minute Maid orange juice
 Richard E. Morse (1809–1864), American physician, politician, and diplomat